Bertram Robert Stivers II (born December 24, 1961), is a Republican member of the Kentucky Senate representing the 25th Senate District since 1997. He served as the Republican Majority Leader of the Kentucky State Senate through 2012 and became the President of the Kentucky Senate on the opening day of the 2013 legislative session on January 8.

Personal life
Stivers graduated from the University of Kentucky with a B.S. in Industrial Management and a minor in Economics. He graduated with a Juris Doctor from the Louis D. Brandeis School of Law at the University of Louisville. At Kentucky, Stivers became a member of Phi Sigma Kappa fraternity.

He worked as Assistant Commonwealth Attorney in Clay County from 1989 to 1993.  Stivers ran and lost a bid for Commonwealth Attorney in 1993.

Stivers lives and works in Manchester, Kentucky.

State Senator
In 1996, Stivers ran for State Senate. He beat Democratic nominee Charles Derrickson with 52% of the vote.

Stivers was sworn into office in 1997 to represent the 25th District.  The 25th District includes Clay, Jackson, Knox, McCreary, Owsley, and Whitley Counties.

Stivers won contested re-elections in 2000, 2004, 2008, and 2012. Stivers won an uncontested re-election in 2016.

Committee assignments
Session Committees
BR Sub. on Justice & Judiciary – Liaison Member
Committee on Committees – Vice Chair
Judiciary
Natural Resources and Energy
Rules – Vice Chair
State & Local Government

Interim Committees
BR Sub. on Justice & Judiciary – Liaison Member
Energy Special Subcommittee
Judiciary
Local Government
Natural Resources & Environment
State Government

Statutory Committees
Legislative Research Commission

Senate Majority Floor Leader
In 2008, Stivers was elected Republican Majority Leader of the Kentucky State Senate. He succeeded State Senator Dan Kelly (R) when Kelly was appointed to Kentucky Judiciary by Governor Steve Beshear (D).

Senate President
After then-Senate President David Williams resigned in November 2012 to accept an appointment as a circuit judge, Stivers was elected by the Republican caucus as Williams' successor. He was elected by the full Senate on the opening day of the 2013 legislative session.

In March 2020 during the first session of the Kentucky Senate since Democrat Andy Beshear took office as Governor, Stivers proposed legislation to strip powers away from the Governor.

External links

References

|-

|-

1961 births
21st-century American politicians
Kentucky lawyers
Republican Party Kentucky state senators
Living people
People from Laurel County, Kentucky
People from Manchester, Kentucky
University of Kentucky College of Law alumni
Presidents of the Kentucky Senate